Hyperphyscia is a genus of lichenized fungi in the family Physciaceae.

References

Caliciales
Lichen genera
Caliciales genera
Taxa described in 1894
Taxa named by Johannes Müller Argoviensis